Gross domestic product (GDP) is the market value of all final goods and services from a nation in a given year. Countries are sorted by nominal GDP estimates from financial and statistical institutions, which are calculated at market or government official exchange rates. Nominal GDP does not take into account differences in the cost of living in different countries, and the results can vary greatly from one year to another based on fluctuations in the exchange rates of the country's currency. Such fluctuations may change a country's ranking from one year to the next, even though they often make little or no difference in the standard of living of its population.

List of nominal GDP for European countries in billion USD 
This is a sortable list of all European countries by their gross domestic product in billions of US dollars at market or official government exchange rates (nominal GDP), according to the International Monetary Fund. The economic and political map of Europe also includes: Turkey, Georgia, Armenia, Azerbaijan, Kazakhstan and Kosovo.

See also
List of sovereign states and dependent territories in Europe by GDP (PPP)
List of U.S. states and territories by GDP
List of metropolitan areas in the European Union by GDP
List of European countries by budget revenues
List of European countries by budget revenues per capita
Economy of Europe
World economy
European Union
OSCE countries statistics

Sources
International Monetary Fund, World Economic Outlook Database, April 2016 edition
International Monetary Fund, World Economic Outlook Database, October 2016 edition

References

Europe
GDP (nominal)
GDP (nominal)
GDP (nominal), List of European countries by
Economy of Europe-related lists